The 1983 Family Circle Cup was a women's tennis tournament played on outdoor clay courts at the Sea Pines Plantation on Hilton Head Island, South Carolina in the United States that was part of the 1983 Virginia Slims World Championship Series. It was the 11th edition of the tournament and was held from April 4 through April 10, 1983. Martina Navratilova won the singles title and earned $34,000 first-prize money.

Finals

Singles

 Martina Navratilova defeated  Tracy Austin 5–7, 6–0, 6–1
 It was Navratilova's 6th singles title of the year and the 76th of her career.

Doubles

 Martina Navratilova /  Candy Reynolds defeated  Andrea Jaeger /  Paula Smith 6–2, 6–3
 It was Navratilova's 12th title of the year and the 159th of her career. It was Reynolds' 3rd title of the year and the 11th of her career.

Prize money

References

External links
 Women's Tennis Association (WTA) tournament edition details
 International Tennis Federation (ITF) tournament edition details

 
Family Circle Cup
Charleston Open
Family Circle Cup
Family Circle Cup
Family Circle Cup